The Book Review is a peer-reviewed academic journal covering reviews for books of various subjects. Regarded as India's first English-language review journal, it was founded in January 1976 by Chitra Narayanan, Uma Iyengar, and Chandra Chari; the latter two are the editor-in-chiefs. In 1985, the journal was ceased from publication but was revived two years later.

References

External links 
 

Academic journals published in India
English-language journals
Monthly journals
Publications established in 1976